de Lillo is a surname. Notable people with the surname include:

Domenico De Lillo (born 1937), Italian cyclist
Don DeLillo (born 1936), American writer and playwright
Ginés de Lillo (1566–1630), Spanish soldier

See also
Puebla de Lillo, municipality in the province of León, Castile and León, Spain
San Miguel de Lillo, church in Asturias, Spain